Huria Matenga ( – 24 April 1909, also known as Julia Martin) was a New Zealand tribal leader and landowner. Of Māori descent, she identified with the Ngati Tama, Ngati Toa and Te Ati Awa iwi. She was born in Whakapuaka, Nelson, New Zealand in about 1842.

She became known as "the Grace Darling of New Zealand" after her heroics in the rescuing of the crew of the brigantine Delaware, which struck rocks during a gale close to Pepin Island in 1863.

Matenga was also a weaver and two of her woven items are in the collection at Te Papa Tongarewa Museum of New Zealand.

References

1840s births
1909 deaths
People from Nelson, New Zealand
Ngāti Tama people
Ngāti Toa people
Te Āti Awa people